John R. Corbid (born February 11, 1945) was an American politician and educator.

Corbid lived in Oklee, Red Lake County, Minnesota with his wife and family. He received his bachelor's degree in social science from University of North Dakota and was a teacher. Corbid served in the Minnesota House of Representatives from 1975 to 1980 and was a Democrat.

References

1945 births
Living people
People from Red Lake County, Minnesota
University of North Dakota alumni
Schoolteachers from Minnesota
Democratic Party members of the Minnesota House of Representatives